Faith Dane (October 3, 1923 – April 7, 2020), sometimes known since her second marriage as Faith Crannitch but legally simply Faith since 1983, was an actress, musician, artist, and perennial candidate for elected office in Washington, D.C.

Dane was a resident of Washington, D.C., but grew up and spent much of her life in New York City; she also lived in the United States Virgin Islands for much of the 1960s. She was married twice; first, in the 1960s, to attorney Russell Johnson, a former attorney general of the U.S. Virgin Islands, who first encouraged her to run for office, and second, in 1983, to Jude Crannitch, an artist originally from New Zealand.

Dane played the bugle-tooting burlesque stripper Mazeppa ("Once I was a schlepper, now I'm Miss Mazeppa") in both the original Broadway and film versions of Gypsy.  When Gypsy was revived on Broadway without her, she sued, claiming she'd created much of the characterization of Mazeppa herself; though the suit was unsuccessful, producers developed a “Faith Dane clause” in actors' contracts granting rights in any creative work actors do developing their character to the production.

Dane was a candidate for the Virgin Islands Legislature in 1964 on an arts support-based platform. She raised funds for various school art programs there, including St. Dunstan's Episcopal High School. After moving to Washington in the 1980s, she was a candidate for mayor as an independent in 1990, 1994, and 1998, garnering 110, 423, and 430 votes, respectively. In 2002, she ran in the Democratic primary for mayor and received 1,084 votes. On each occasion, she ran on an arts-based platform.

She was an unsuccessful candidate for the D.C. Statehood Green Party nomination for Shadow Representative in 1992, receiving 34% of the vote to Paul McCallister's 52%, and was an independent candidate for Delegate to Congress from the District of Columbia in 1996, receiving 2,119 votes.

In 2010, she ran for mayor in the Statehood Green primary, winning with 40% of the vote in the face of only write-in opposition. In the general election, she received 1,476 votes. She ran for mayor again in 2014, winning the Statehood Green primary with 47%, again with only write-in opposition. In the general election, she received about one percent of the vote.

Dane died at a nursing home in Washington on April 7, 2020, at 96.

References

External links
 
 
 Political Graveyard: Faith Dane
 Our Campaigns: details of all her races

1923 births
2020 deaths
Actresses from New York City
African-American female comedians
African-American musicians
American film actresses
American people of United States Virgin Islands descent
American women comedians
Comedians from New York City
D.C. Statehood Green Party politicians
American LGBT rights activists
Washington, D.C., Independents
20th-century African-American people
20th-century African-American women
21st-century African-American people
21st-century African-American women